The 2011 Three Days of De Panne was the 35th edition of the Three Days of De Panne, an annual bicycle race. Taking part in and around the De Panne region of West Flanders, it began in Middelkerke on 29 March and finished in De Panne two days later. The  stage race comprised four stages, with two held on the final day. It was part of the 2010–2011 UCI Europe Tour and was rated as a 2.HC event. Sébastien Rosseler of  won the general classification, his first ever victory in a stage race.

Teams
23 teams were invited to participate in the tour: 12 UCI ProTeams and 11 UCI Professional Continental Teams.

Stages

Stage 1
29 March 2011 – Middelkerke to Zottegem,

Stage 2
30 March 2011 – Oudenaarde to Koksijde,

Stage 3a
31 March 2011 – De Panne to De Panne,

Stage 3b
31 March 2011 – De Panne to Koksijde to De Panne,  individual time trial (ITT)

Classification leadership

Final standings

References
General

Specific

External links
Three Days of De Panne homepage

Three Days of Bruges–De Panne
2011 in Belgian sport
Three Days of De Panne